Renzo Olivo (born 15 March 1992) is an Argentine professional tennis player. He competes mainly on the ATP Challenger Tour and ITF Futures, both in singles and doubles. He has a career-high singles ranking of World No. 78 achieved on 9 January 2016 and a doubles ranking of World No. 148 achieved on 29 April 2013.

Career
In Bastad, he made it through three rounds of qualifying to reach his first ATP tour main draw, and then he reached the quarterfinals, defeating second seed Tommy Robredo. 

He earned the biggest win of his career at the 2017 French Open, when he beat twelfth seed and home favourite Jo-Wilfried Tsonga in four sets.

ATP Challenger and ITF Futures finals

Singles: 16 (8–8)

Doubles: 32 (16–16)

Singles performance timeline

Current after the 2022 US Open

References

External links
 Official website 
 
 
 

1992 births
Living people
Sportspeople from Rosario, Santa Fe
Argentine male tennis players
Tennis players at the 2010 Summer Youth Olympics
21st-century Argentine people